Bolshoy Urala is a rural locality (a selo) in Tlogobsky Selsoviet, Gunibsky District, Republic of Dagestan, Russia. The population was 170 as of 2010.

Geography 
Bolshoy Urala is located 44 km northwest of Gunib (the district's administrative centre) by road, on the Kunada River. Urala and Maly Urala are the nearest rural localities.

References 

Rural localities in Gunibsky District